In graph theory, a dominating set for a graph  is a subset  of its vertices, such that any vertex of  is either in , or has a neighbor in .

The dominating set problem concerns testing whether  for a given graph  and input ; it is a classical NP-complete decision problem in computational complexity theory. Therefore it is believed that there may be no efficient algorithm that can compute  for all graphs . However, there are efficient approximation algorithms, as well as efficient exact algorithms for certain graph classes.

Dominating sets are of practical interest in several areas. In wireless networking, dominating sets are used to find efficient routes within ad-hoc mobile networks. They have also been used in document summarization, and in designing secure systems for electrical grids.

Formal definition 
Given an undirected graph , a subset of vertices  is called a dominating set if for every vertex , there is a vertex  such that .  

Every graph has at least one dominating set: if  the set of all vertices, then by definition D is a dominating set, since there is no vertex . A more interesting challenge is to find small dominating sets.

Variants 

A connected dominating set is a dominating set that is also connected. If S is a connected dominating set, one can form a spanning tree of G in which S forms the set of non-leaf vertices of the tree; conversely, if T is any spanning tree in a graph with more than two vertices, the non-leaf vertices of T form a connected dominating set. Therefore, finding minimum connected dominating sets is equivalent to finding spanning trees with the maximum possible number of leaves.

A total dominating set (or strongly-dominating set) is a set of vertices such that all vertices in the graph, including the vertices in the dominating set themselves, have a neighbor in the dominating set. That is: for every vertex , there is a vertex  such that . Figure (c) above shows a dominating set that is a connected dominating set and a total dominating set; the examples in figures (a) and (b) are neither. In contrast to a simple dominating set, a total dominating set may not exist. For example, a graph with one or more vertices and no edges does not have a total dominating set.

A dominating edge-set is a set of edges (vertex pairs) whose union is a dominating set; such a set may not exist (for example, a graph with one or more vertices and no edges does not have it). If it exists, then the union of all its edges is a strongly-dominating set. Therefore, the smallest size of an edge-dominating set is at least .

In contrast, an edge-dominating set is a set D of edges, such that every edge not in D is adjacent to at least one edge in D; such a set always exists (for example, the set of all edges is an edge-dominating set).

A k-dominating set is a set of vertices such that each vertex not in the set has at least k neighbors in the set (a standard dominating set is a 1-dominating set). Similarly, a k''-tuple dominating set is a set of vertices such that each vertex in the graph has at least k neighbors in the set (a total dominating set is a 1-tuple dominating set). An -approximation of a minimum k-tuple dominating set can be found in polynomial time. Every graph admits a k-dominating set (for example, the set of all vertices); but only graphs with minimum degree  admit a k-tuple dominating set. However, even if the graph admits k-tuple dominating set, a minimum k-tuple dominating set can be nearly k times as large as a minimum k-dominating set for the same graph; An -approximation of a minimum k-dominating set can be found in polynomial time as well.

A star-dominating set  is a subset D of V such that, for every vertex v in V, the star of v (the set of edges adjacent to v) intersects the star of some vertex in D. Clearly, if G has isolated vertices then it has no star-dominating sets (since the star of isolated vertices is empty). If G has no isolated vertices, then every dominating set is a star-dominating set and vice versa. The distinction between star-domination and usual domination is more substantial when their fractional variants are considered.

A domatic partition is a partition of the vertices into disjoint dominating sets. The domatic number is the maximum size of a domatic partition.

An eternal dominating set is a dynamic version of domination in which a vertex v in dominating set D is chosen and replaced with a neighbor u (u is not in D) such that the modified D is also a dominating set and this process can be repeated over any infinite sequence of choices of vertices v.

Dominating and independent sets

Dominating sets are closely related to independent sets: an independent set is also a dominating set if and only if it is a maximal independent set, so any maximal independent set in a graph is necessarily also a minimal dominating set.

 Domination by independent sets 
A dominating set may or may not be an independent set. For example, figures (a) and (b) above show independent dominating sets, while figure (c) illustrates a dominating set that is not an independent set.

The independent domination number  of a graph  is the size of the smallest dominating set that is an independent set. Equivalently, it is the size of the smallest maximal independent set.

For example, let  be the double star graph'' consisting of vertices , where . Then  since  is a smallest dominating set. If , then  since  is a smallest dominating set that is also independent (it is a smallest maximal independent set).

For example,  if  is a claw-free graph.

Since an induced subgraph of a claw-free graph is claw-free, it follows that every claw-free graphs is also domination-perfect.

Therefore a minimum maximal matching has the same size as a minimum edge dominating set.

Domination of independent sets 
Dominating subsets of vertices requires potentially less vertices than dominating all vertices, so  for all graphs .

For example, for some integer , let  be a graph in which the vertices are the rows and columns of an -by- board, and two such vertices are connected if and only if they intersect. The only independent sets are sets of only rows or sets of only columns, and each of them can be dominated by a single vertex (a column or a row), so . However, to dominate all vertices we need at least one row and one column, so . Moreover, the ratio between  can be arbitrarily large.

The following relations hold for any graph :

History

The domination problem was studied from the 1950s onwards, but the rate of research on domination significantly increased in the mid-1970s. In 1972, Richard Karp proved the set cover problem to be NP-complete. This had immediate implications for the dominating set problem, as there are straightforward vertex to set and edge to non-disjoint-intersection bijections between the two problems. This proved the dominating set problem to be NP-complete as well.

Algorithms and computational complexity 

The set cover problem is a well-known NP-hard problem – the decision version of set covering was one of Karp's 21 NP-complete problems. There exist a pair of polynomial-time L-reductions between the minimum dominating set problem and the set cover problem. These reductions (see below) show that an efficient algorithm for the minimum dominating set problem would provide an efficient algorithm for the set cover problem, and vice versa. Moreover, the reductions preserve the approximation ratio: for any α, a polynomial-time  algorithm for minimum dominating sets would provide a polynomial-time  algorithm for the set cover problem and vice versa. Both problems are in fact Log-APX-complete.

The approximability of set covering is also well understood: a logarithmic approximation factor can be found by using a simple greedy algorithm, and finding a sublogarithmic approximation factor is NP-hard.

L-reductions

The following two reductions show that the minimum dominating set problem and the set cover problem are equivalent under L-reductions: given an instance of one problem, we can construct an equivalent instance of the other problem.

From dominating set to set covering

Furthermore, there is a simple algorithm that maps a dominating set to a set cover of the same size and vice versa. In particular, an efficient  algorithm for set covering provides an efficient  algorithm for minimum dominating sets.

For example, given the graph  shown on the right, we construct a set cover instance with the universe  and the subsets      and  In this example,  is a dominating set for  – this corresponds to the set cover  For example, the vertex  is dominated by the vertex , and the element  is contained in the set .

From set covering to dominating set
Let  be an instance of the set cover problem with the universe  and the family of subsets  we assume that  and the index set  are disjoint.

In this example,  is a set cover; this corresponds to the dominating set 

 is another dominating set for the graph . The dominating set  corresponds to the set cover

Special cases

If the graph has maximum degree Δ, then the greedy approximation algorithm finds an -approximation of a minimum dominating set. For fixed Δ, this qualifies as a dominating set for APX membership; in fact, it is APX-complete.

The problem admits a polynomial-time approximation scheme (PTAS) for special cases such as unit disk graphs and planar graphs. A minimum dominating set can be found in linear time in series–parallel graphs.

Exact algorithms

A minimum dominating set of an -vertex graph can be found in time  by inspecting all vertex subsets.  show how to find a minimum dominating set in time  and exponential space, and in time  and polynomial space. The number of minimal dominating sets is at most  and all such sets can be listed in time  .

Parameterized complexity

Finding a dominating set of size  plays a central role in the theory of parameterized complexity. It is the most well-known problem complete for the class W[2]  and used in many reductions to show intractability of other problems. In particular, the problem is not fixed-parameter tractable in the sense that no algorithm with running time  for any function  exists unless the W-hierarchy collapses to FPT=W[2].

On the other hand, if the input graph is planar, the problem remains NP-hard, but a fixed-parameter algorithm is known. More generally, the dominating set problem and many variants of the problem are fixed-parameter tractable when parameterized by both the size of the dominating set and the size of the smallest forbidden complete bipartite subgraph; that is, the problem is FPT on biclique-free graphs, a very general class of sparse graphs that includes the planar graphs.

The complementary set to a dominating set, a nonblocker, can be found by a fixed-parameter algorithm on any graph.

See also 
Vizing's conjecture - relates the domination number of a cartesian product of graphs to the domination number of its factors.
 Set cover problem
 Bondage number
 Nonblocker - the complement of a dominating set.

Notes

References 
.
.
.
.

.
.
.
.
.
, p. 190, problem GT2.
.
.
.

.
.
.
.

Further reading
.
.
.
.
.

Graph theory objects
NP-complete problems
Computational problems in graph theory